Chah Gazi or Chah-e Gazi may refer to:
 Chah Gazi, Lamerd
 Chah Gazi, Mohr